René Keller is an East German luger who competed in the mid-1980s. He won the silver medal in the men's doubles event at the 1985 FIL World Luge Championships in Oberhof, East Germany.

Keller's best overall finish in the Luge World Cup was third in men's doubles in 1984-5.

References
Hickok sports information on World champions in luge and skeleton.
List of men's doubles luge World Cup champions since 1978.

Living people
German male lugers
Year of birth missing (living people)